The individual eventing in equestrian at the 1936 Olympic Games in Berlin was held on the May Field (dressage), in Döberitz (cross-country), and at the Olympiastadion (jumping) from 13 to 16 August. Of the 50 horse and rider pairs to begin the competition, only 27 finished. Three horses died during the competition. 

The fourth jump was a relatively novel obstacle: a jump over a hurdle into a pond. Of the 46 pairs remaining by that point in the competition, 28 had a fall of the horse or the rider at that obstacle. This included one of the equine fatalities, the American horse Slippery Slim. The International Equestrian Federation subsequently temporarily banned such jumps.

Competition format
The team and individual eventing competitions used the same scores. Eventing consisted of a dressage test, a cross-country test, and a jumping test.

The dressage test was a 12 section test. The maximum time allotted was 13 minutes; points were deducted over that time. The maximum score was 400 points, though the results typically listed the difference between the score and that maximum (that is, a score of 250 would be listed as a "loss of points" of 150).

The 36 km cross-country test had five phases: (1) a 7 km road stretch; (2) a 4 km, 12 obstacle steeplechase; (3) a 15 km road stretch; (4) an 8 km, 35 obstacle cross-country course; and (5) a 2 km road stretch. Points could be lost for refusals or falls at the obstacles in the second a fourth phases, with three refusals at the same obstacle resulting in elimination. Points could also be lost if maximum time limits for each phase were exceeded; however, points could be gained instead if the pair finished the obstacle phases under the allotted time.

The jumping test featured 12 obstacles and had a time limit of 155 seconds. Points were lost for faults (including elimination for the third refusal on the course) and for exceeding the time limit.

Results

Standings after dressage

Standings after cross-country

No pair was over time on Stage A, so no points were lost in that phase.

Final results after jumping

References

Equestrian at the Summer Olympics